Dying Like Ophelia is a 2002 award-winning six-minute drama, directed by Ed Gass-Donnelly, produced by Veni Vidi Vici Motion Pictures and based on an excerpt of the play Lion in the Streets by Judith Thompson, two-time winner of the Governor General Award.  Karyn Dwyer plays a young working class mother dying of cancer who wishes to die a beautiful and poetic death like that portrayed in Millais's famous painting of Ophelia.

References
 

2002 short films
2002 films
2002 drama films
Films directed by Ed Gass-Donnelly
Canadian drama short films
2000s Canadian films